United States competed at the 1998 Winter Paralympics in Nagano, Japan. 49 competitors from United States won 34 medals including 13 gold, 8 silver and 13 bronze and finished 3rd in the medal table.

See also 
 United States at the Paralympics
 United States at the 1998 Winter Olympics

References 

1998
1998 in American sports
Nations at the 1998 Winter Paralympics